The following is a timeline of the history of the city of Ljubljana, Slovenia.

Prior to 19th century

 35 BCE - Emona, a Roman castrum (fort), founded by emperor Augustus.
 400 - Emona besieged by Alaric I.
 451 - Emona desolated by the Huns.
 900 - Laibach suffered from the Magyars.
 11th C. - Construction of Ljubljana Castle probably started.
 12th C. - Duchy of Carinthia in power.
 1270 – Ottokar II of Bohemia in power.
 1277 – Habsburgs in power.
 1335 – Town becomes capital of Carniola, province of the Holy Roman Empire.
 1370 – St. Bartholomew's Church first mentioned.
 1461 – Roman Catholic diocese of Laibach established.
 1484 – Town Hall built.
 1504 – Janez Lantheri becomes first elected mayor.
 1511 – 1511 Idrija earthquake.
 1536 – Protestant Latin school established.
 1599 – Jesuit school established.
 1622 – 5 May: 1622 Slovenia earthquake.
 1658 –  built.
 1660 – Franciscan Church of the Annunciation built.
 1693 – Academia Operosorum Labacensium founded.
 1701 – Academia Philharmonicorum Labacensis founded.
 1703 – Tivoli Castle built.
 1707 – St. Nicholas's Cathedral rebuilt.
 1719 – Town Hall, Baroque renovation completed
 1747 – Visitation of Mary Church built.
 1751 – Robba Fountain installed in the Town Square.
 1755 – Cekin Mansion built.
 1767 – Society of Agriculture and the Useful Arts in the Duchy of Carniola founded.
 1777 – Gruber Palace built.
 1778 – Laibacher Zeitung German-language newspaper begins publication.
 1780 –  constructed (approximate date).
 1797 – Town occupied by French forces.

19th century
 1809 – Town occupied by French forces again.
 1810 – Botanical Garden established.
 1813 – French occupation ends.
 1816 - Laibach was the capital of the Kingdom of Illyria (to 1849).
 1821
 January–May: International Congress of Laibach held in Laibach.
 Congress Square laid out.
 Estate Museum of Carniola founded.
 1837 – Casino Building constructed.
 1842 – Franz's Bridge built.
 1848 – Railway station built.
 1849 – Vienna-Laibach railroad begins operating.
 1857 – Trieste-Laibach railway built.
 1861 – Gas lighting installed.
 1867 – Hradecky Bridge built.
 1869 – Population: 22,593.
 1871 – Tobačna Ljubljana (tobacco factory) begins operating.
 1889 – Vodnik statue erected in Vodnik Square.
 1890
 Waterworks introduced.
 Population: 30,691.
 1892 – Provincial Theatre built.
 1895 – 14 April: Earthquake.
 1897 – Central Pharmacy built.
 1898 – Kresija Palace built.
 1899 – Government Palace built.
 1900 - Population: 36,547.

20th century

 1901
 Tram begins operating.
 Dragon Bridge built.
 1903 – Jek Bridge rebuilt.
 1905
 Grand Hotel Union built.
 Prešeren Monument erected on Prešeren Square.
 1907 – Mladika built.
 1908 – Slovene Philharmonic Orchestra active.
 1918
 City becomes part of the newly established Kingdom of Serbs, Croats and Slovenes.
 National Gallery of Slovenia founded.
 St. Peter's Bridge rebuilt.
 1919
 University of Ljubljana and  founded.
 Ljubljana National Drama Theatre in use.
 Population: 60,000.
 1923 – Palace Theatre built.
 1933 – Nebotičnik hi-rise built.
 1935 – City Museum of Ljubljana established.
 1937 –  on Čop Street rebuilt.
 1938 – Academy of Sciences and Arts founded.
 1939
 Ljubljana Central Market built.
 Academy of Music active.
 1941
 April: City annexed by Italy.
 National and University Library of Slovenia building constructed.
 1942 – "Occupiers surrounded Ljubljana with a 30-kilometre barb wire fence."
 1943 – German occupation begins.
 1945
 Occupation ends.
 Academy of Theatre established.
 Ljubljanica Sluice Gate built.
 1951
  begins operating.
 Dnevnik newspaper begins publication.
 1953 – Population: 138,211.
 1955 – Biennial of Graphic Arts (Ljubljana) begins.
 1959 – Exhibition and Convention Centre (Ljubljana) built.
 1965
 Tivoli Hall (arena) opens in Tivoli City Park.
 SKB bank established.(sl)
 1966 –  formed.
 1971
 City bus service no. 1 (Ljubljana) begins operating.
 Population: 173,853 city; 213,298 urban agglomeration.
 1975 - Ljubljana University Medical Centre opened.
 1982 – Cankar Hall built.
 1984 – Druga godba music festival begins.
 1985 – Trail of Remembrance and Comradeship created.
 1990 – Ljubljana International Film Festival begins.
 1991
 25 June: Ljubljana designated capital of newly declared independent Slovenia.
 27 June: Airport bombed by Yugoslav People's Army.
 Slovenske novice newspaper begins publication.
 1993 – Prule Bridge built.
 1999 – General Maister Monument (Brdar) erected.

21st century

 2001
 Noisefest begins.
 Kolosej Ljubljana cinema opens.
 2004 – May: Slovenia becomes part of the European Union.
 2005
 31 October: SKB bank robbery occurs.(sl)
 November: Economic protest.
 2006
 Filofest of student films begins.
 Zoran Janković becomes mayor.
 2010 – City named World Book Capital by UNESCO.
 2011 – "Tito Street" issue decided.
 2012 – November: Anti-austerity 2012–13 Slovenian protests begin.
 2014 – Population: 277,554.

See also
 Ljubljana history
 Timeline of Ljubljana (in Slovenian)
 Other names of Ljubljana, e.g. Laibach, Laybach, Lubiana
 List of mayors of Ljubljana
 Timeline of Slovenian history

References

This article incorporates information from the Slovene Wikipedia and German Wikipedia.

Bibliography

in English

in other languages

External links

 Items related to Ljubljana, various dates (via Europeana).
 Items related to Ljubljana, various dates (via Digital Public Library of America).

 
Ljubljana-related lists
Ljubljana
Slovenia history-related lists
Years in Slovenia
Ljubljana